Defiance is a city in and the county seat of Defiance County, Ohio, United States, about  southwest of Toledo and  northeast of Fort Wayne, Indiana, in Ohio's northwestern corner. The population was 16,494 at the 2010 census.

History
The city contains the site of Fort Defiance, built by General "Mad" Anthony Wayne in August 1794, during the Northwest Indian War at the confluence of the Auglaize and Maumee rivers. General Wayne surveyed the land and declared to General Scott, "I defy the English, Indians, and all the devils of hell to take it." Using the fort as a base of operations, Wayne ordered his troops to destroy Native American crops and villages within a radius of  around the fort. Today a pair of cannons outside the city library on the Maumee River overlook the confluence and mark the location of Fort Defiance, along with a mounded outline of the fort walls. The city was named after Fort Defiance.

From Fort Defiance, the U.S. forces moved northeast along the Maumee River to fight the decisive Battle of Fallen Timbers near the current town of Maumee, Ohio. This victory secured for the United States the Northwest Territory, now the states of Ohio, Michigan, Indiana, Illinois, and Wisconsin.

Fort Winchester was built on the same spot during the War of 1812, but it was a larger fort that extended southward somewhat along the Auglaize River. Historical plaques in the sidewalks mark the full extent of Fort Winchester.

In 1822 Defiance was laid out as a town. In 1845 it was made the county seat of the newly created county, and in 1881 it became a city.

Geography
Defiance is located at  (41.281891, -84.362856).

Defiance lends its name to a distinct end moraine from the Wisconsian glaciation. As Cushing et al. point out, "The Defiance moraine represents the last notable stand of the glacial front in this region." The moraine varies in width from 2 to 4 miles, and according to Leverett, "it is like a broad wave whose crest stands 20 to 50 feet above the border of the plain outside it."

Climate

Demographics

2010 census
As of the census of 2010, there were 16,494 people, 6,663 households, and 4,291 families living in the city. The racial makeup of the city was 88.1% White, 3.6% African American, 0.3% Native American, 0.4% Asian, 4.8% from other races, and 2.8% from two or more races. Hispanic or Latino people of any race were 14.4% of the population.

There were 6,663 households, of which 31.4% had children under the age of 18 living with them, 45.3% were married couples living together, 13.9% had a female householder with no husband present, 5.3% had a male householder with no wife present, and 35.6% were non-families. 29.4% of all households were made up of individuals, and 11.5% had someone living alone who was 65 years of age or older. The average household size was 2.38 and the average family size was 2.91.

The median age in the city was 37.1 years. 24.1% of residents were under the age of 18; 10.9% were between the ages of 18 and 24; 23.7% were from 25 to 44; 26% were from 45 to 64; and 15.3% were 65 years of age or older. The gender makeup of the city was 48.3% male and 51.7% female.

2000 census
As of the census of 2000, there were 16,465 people, 6,572 households, and 4,422 families living in the city. The population density was 1,562.4 people per square mile (603.1/km). There were 7,061 housing units at an average density of 670.0 per square mile (258.7/km). The racial makeup of the city was 87.15% White, 3.44% African American, 0.32% Native American, 0.39% Asian, 0.05% Pacific Islander, 6.50% from other races, and 2.15% from two or more races. Hispanic or Latino people of any race were 12.75% of the population.

There were 6,572 households, out of which 33.0% had children under the age of 18 living with them, 50.2% were married couples living together, 12.6% had a female householder with no husband present, and 32.7% were non-families. 27.6% of all households were made up of individuals, and 10.3% had someone living alone who was 65 years of age or older. The average household size was 2.43 and the average family size was 2.95.

In the city the population was composed of 25.7% under the age of 18, 11.1% from 18 to 24, 26.8% from 25 to 44, 22.9% from 45 to 64, and 13.6% 65 years of age or older. The median age was 35 years. For every 100 females, there were 94.1 males. For every 100 females age 18 and over, there were 90.1 males.

The median income for households was $41,670, and the median income for a family was $49,599. Males had a median income of $37,322, compared to $23,938 for females. The per capita income for the city was $19,790. About 7.4% of families and 8.8% of the population were below the poverty line, including 12.0% of those under age 18 and 7.1% of those age 65 or over.

Education

Defiance City Schools provide public K-12 education. Schools maintained by local Lutheran and Catholic churches also provide preschool-grade 8 education. Northeastern Local Schools (Tinora) and Ayersville Local Schools also serve rural Defiance, but each is a smaller school district.

There are three high schools in the Defiance area: Defiance (located in Defiance), Tinora (part of Northeastern Local Schools) and Ayersville High Schools. Tinora and Ayersville High Schools are located a few miles from the main city and serve the rural areas of Defiance County to the northeast and southeast, respectively, of Defiance.

Defiance College is a small liberal arts college affiliated with the United Church of Christ and has an enrollment of about 1,000 students.

Defiance has a public library, a branch of the Defiance Public Library System.

Parks and recreation

Defiance has several city parks that offer a variety of recreational activities, including baseball and softball diamonds, as well as playground equipment. These parks include Kingsbury Park and Diehl Park. Kingsbury Park also has a public swimming pool.

Independence Dam State Park, 4 miles east of the city on State Highway 424, along the Maumee River, is also a popular recreational site for area residents. The park provides picnic facilities, nature trails, and fishing. There is a reservoir with adjacent trails, along with a track up top. There is also a Frisbee golf course. On the other side, there is a dog park.

Fort Defiance Park is a park that currently occupies the site of the former Fort Defiance. In 1980, the park was added to the National Register of Historic Places.

Media

Newspaper
The Crescent-News

Radio
WONW, 1280 AM, news-talk
WDFM, 98.1 FM, "Hot AC"
WZOM, 105.7 FM "The Bull", country

Television
WNHO-LD channel 44, repeater of WLMA, Lima, Ohio

Notable people

Kevin Bacon, Ohio Senator
Doug Bair,  pitcher for seven Major League Baseball teams
Chad Billingsley, former pitcher for the Los Angeles Dodgers
Michelle Burke, television and film actress
Wild Bill Davison, jazz cornet player
Alene Duerk, became the first female admiral in the U.S. Navy in 1972 
Alan Francis, 24-time Horseshoe World Champion
Chet Grant, football player and journalist
Asel Hagerty (1837–1919), Canadian-born Medal of Honor recipient in the American Civil War, buried in Defiance
Jessicka Havok, professional wrestler 
Michael Hitchcock, actor, comedian, screenwriter, and television producer
Sam Hornish Jr., Indianapolis 500 winner and part-time driver in the NASCAR Xfinity Series
Greg Kampe, men's head basketball coach at Oakland University
Sarah Kurtz, materials scientist and member of the National Academy of Engineering
Don Miller, one of the Four Horsemen of Notre Dame
Ray T. Miller, 43rd Mayor of Cleveland
Jon Niese, pitcher for the Pittsburgh Pirates
Jason Osborne, majority leader for New Hampshire House of Representatives
Chad Reineke, pitcher for the Cincinnati Reds
Terry "Tuff" Ryan, author of The Prize Winner of Defiance, Ohio, daughter of Evelyn Ryan (the subject of the book)
Bruce Shingledecker, Alaskan wildlife painter
H. Allen Smith, humorist
Walter W. Wensinger, highly decorated lieutenant general in the Marine Corps during World War II

References

External links
 City website
 Defiance Development & Visitors Bureau
 Defiance Public Library
 Maumee Valley Heritage Corridor

 
County seats in Ohio
Cities in Defiance County, Ohio
Cities in Ohio